Gem is an unincorporated community in Sugar Creek Township, Hancock County, Indiana.

History
Gem was never properly laid out or platted. A store and a saw mill were built at Gem in 1871.

A post office was established at Gem in 1877, and remained in operation until it was discontinued in 1907.

Geography

References

Unincorporated communities in Hancock County, Indiana
Unincorporated communities in Indiana
Indianapolis metropolitan area